Orda is the name of several rural localities in Russia:
Orda, Perm Krai, a selo in Ordinsky District of Perm Krai
Orda, Tver Oblast, a village in Vesyegonsky District of Tver Oblast
Orda, Yaroslavl Oblast, a village in Poshekhonsky District of Yaroslavl Oblast